Jan Van Der Auwera (9 January 1924 – 17 March 2004) was a Belgian footballer who played for KRC Mechelen and the Belgium national team.

References

External links
 

Belgian footballers
K.R.C. Mechelen players
Association football defenders
1924 births
2004 deaths
Belgium international footballers